Alians is a Polish punk-rock, reggae and ska band, founded in 1990 in Piła. Alians' first concert took place on May 19, 1990, in Bydgoszcz, with three founding members: Rafał Kasprzak (guit, voc.), Michał Thiede (bg) and Dariusz Kułak (drums). The band features punky reggae - a unique mix of the three kinds of music mentioned above. Apart from usual instruments, such as guitars, bass and drums, its members also use trumpets, accordion, trombone and saxophone. Alians is known for its politically engaged lyrics, inspired by such bands as The Clash and Dead Kennedys and by Anarchism as well as left-wing political movements from Latin America.

Until November 2007, Alians has played 470 concerts, not only in Poland, but also in several countries of Europe (Germany, Belgium, the Netherlands, Slovakia, Norway, Lithuania, England), together with such groups as Fugazi, The Ukrainians, No Means No and Chumbawamba. Even though the band is regarded as one of the most popular underground groups in Poland, its popularity is limited, as it is not featured in mainstream mass-media.

Discography
 Sami wobec siebie (1990)
 Mega Yoga (1991)
 Gavroche (1994)
 Cała anarchia mieści się w uliczniku (1996)
 W samo południe (1998)
 Równe prawa (2000)
 Pełnia (2003)
 Nielegalni (2007)
 Egzystencjalna rzeźnia (2010)

Members
 Rafał "Kazi" Kasprzak – guitar, vocals
 Tomasz "Korabol" Kułak – accordion
 Magdalena Czerwińska – keyboard instruments
 Jacek "Global" Pióro – bass guitar
 Rafał "Czajnik" Czajkowski – guitar
 Marcin "Gwizdek" Gwizdun – trombone
 Tomasz "Guma" Kumiega – saxophone
 Mirosław Chojnacki – drums
 Mariusz Pałaszyński – trumpet

Past members
 Michał "Dósiołek" Thiede – vocals, bass guitar, melodica
 Darek "Q" Kułak – drums
 Bartosz "Szkodnik" Klink – trumpet
 Sebastian "Anem" Czajkowski – keyboard instruments
 Paweł Czaja – drums
 Grzegorz "Świeca" Oświeciński – trumpet

Sources

External links
Official page of the band
Listen and watch Alians' song Ulica on youtube.com

Polish punk rock groups
Musical groups established in 1990
1990 establishments in Poland